Moses Frank Ekpo  (born in Akwa Ibom State) is a Nigerian politician and the Deputy Governor of Akwa Ibom State. He is popularly known as "Uncle Mo".

References 

Akwa Ibom State politicians
Peoples Democratic Party (Nigeria) politicians
Living people
Year of birth missing (living people)